Saki Naka is a metro station on Line 1 of the Mumbai Metro serving the Saki Naka neighbourhood of Andheri in Mumbai, India. It was opened to the public on 8 June 2014.

History

Station layout

Facilities

List of available ATM at Saki Naka metro station are

Connections

There are 4 exits to Saki Naka metro station. Gates 5 and 6 are towards Andheri Kurla road, gates 1 and 3 are towards Powai, while the rest are towards 90 feet road and Ghatkopar.

See also
Public transport in Mumbai
List of Mumbai Metro stations
List of rapid transit systems in India
List of Metro Systems

References

External links

The official site of Mumbai Metro
 UrbanRail.Net – descriptions of all metro systems in the world, each with a schematic map showing all stations.

Mumbai Metro stations
Railway stations in India opened in 2014
2014 establishments in Maharashtra